Mainer Patrick Hines (March 17, 1930 in Burkeville, Texas – August 12, 1985 in Manhattan, New York) was an American actor who was probably best known for his  portrayal of Kapellmeister Giuseppe Bonno in the 1984 film Amadeus. He also appeared as Samuel Chase in the film 1776. Other films include The Brink's Job, Bloodrage and A Passage to India.

Stage
On Broadway Hines was a character actor, he made his debut as Friar Pete in the 1957 production of Measure for Measure in a cast which included Norman Lloyd and Ellis Rabb. He created the role of Orsini-Rosenberg in the original New York production of Amadeus and appeared with Rex Harrison in the 1979 revival of Shaw's Caesar and Cleopatra in the role of Pothinus. Other shows include roles in The Iceman Cometh, with Jason Robards Jr., and The Devils.

Death
In 1985, Hines died of a heart attack at the age of 55.

Filmography

References

External links
 

1985 deaths
1930 births
20th-century American male actors
American male Shakespearean actors
American male stage actors
Male actors from Texas
People from Newton County, Texas